1000 Words may refer to:

 "1000 Words" (Final Fantasy X-2), a song for the video game Final Fantasy X-2
 1000-Word Philosophy, an online philosophy anthology
 Thousand Character Classic, a Chinese poem used as a primer for teaching Chinese characters to children

See also
A Thousand Words (disambiguation)